Joachim Napoléon Michel Murat, 6th Prince Murat (6 August 1885, in Paris, Île-de-France, France – 11 May 1938, in Paris), was a member of the Bonaparte-Murat family.

Biography
His parents were Joachim, 5th Prince Murat and Marie Cécile Ney d'Elchingen, great-granddaughter of Marshal Michel Ney. As heir to the princely title of Murat, he used the courtesy title of  Prince of Pontecorvo until he succeeded his father in 1932.

In 1914 Murat served as a lieutenant of cavalry following the outbreak of World War I. He became an official interpreter to the General Headquarters of the Royal Flying Corps (RFC), based at Saint-Omer from August 1914 to November 1915. One of his British colleagues at St-Omer was Maurice Baring, a lieutenant in the RFC, assistant to General David Henderson and later Hugh Trenchard. Murat is frequently mentioned in Baring's memoirs..

He subsequently commanded the  during the Battle of Verdun in 1916, where his conduct earned him the Croix de Guerre with three citations.

After the war he was elected député for the Lot in the 1919 French legislative election of 16 November in Labastide-Murat. He was aligned with the National Bloc coalition, symbolised by the blue-grey uniforms (Bleu Horizon [fr]) worn by the 'poilus' in the war. The coalition represented the conservative old soldiers and their desire to "make Germany pay".

During this XIIth parliamentary session, he was a member of the Alsace-Lorraine commission [fr], the Algerian commission and for the colonies and protectorates, the commission for the fr:French Merchant Navy, and that of Customs and National Conventions. 

During the session of 22 January 1920 he raised the matter of Léon Accambray [fr], whose espionage for the Germans during World War I was only fully discovered in the 1960s.

Although he was defeated in the 1924 elections and lost his seat, he continued to support the Appel au peuple parliamentary group as the representative of Napoléon in the Bonapartiste movement. He died in Paris on 11 May 1938.

Family life
On December 13, 1927, he married in Colombes, France, Louise Amélie Plantié, daughter of Eugène Plantié, Prefect of Constantine, and granddaughter of Jean-Baptiste Plantié, Senator of Basses-Pyrénées. They had two children:

Joachim, 7th Prince Murat (1920–1944) (shot in 1944 while fighting for the French Resistance)
Princess Caroline Murat (1921–2003)

Ancestry

References

External links
Descendants from the Napoléonic era during the Great War (in French), with photo of Murat in uniform
Bernard French web search site

of the First French Empire

|-

1885 births
1938 deaths
19th-century French people
Military personnel from Paris
Politicians from Paris
House of Bonaparte
Murat
French military personnel of World War I
French people of American descent
Recipients of the Croix de Guerre 1914–1918 (France)
Princes Murat
Interpreters
Members of the 12th Chamber of Deputies of the French Third Republic
Appel au peuple